Congoglanis howesi is a species of catfish in the genus Congoglanis. It lives in the Luachimo River in Angola. Its length reaches 11.3 cm. It is named after ichthyologist Gordon J. Howes.

References 

Amphiliidae
Freshwater fish of Africa
Fish described in 2012